Three Strings to her Bow is an Australian film directed by George Young. Now considered a lost film, it was billed as "a fine farcical comedy."

References

External links
 

Australian black-and-white films
1911 films
Australian silent films
Lost Australian films
Australian comedy films
1911 comedy films
1911 lost films
Lost comedy films